("macaronic Portuguese", pronounced  by its speakers) is an Italian-Portuguese macaronic language that was widely spoken by Italian immigrants in Brazil (especially in the Greater São Paulo area and elsewhere in the São Paulo state) well into the 1950s and early 1960s.

History

The  (as it was called in Italian) was created in 20th-century Brazil by the many thousands of Italian emigrants, who moved to live in the São Paulo area.

.

The Italian community of São Paulo is one of the strongest, with a presence throughout the city. Of the 9 million inhabitants of São Paulo, 50% (4.5 million people) have full or partial Italian ancestry. São Paulo has more descendants of Italians than any Italian city (the largest city of Italy is Rome, with 2.5 million inhabitants).

Even today, Italians are grouped in neighborhoods like Bixiga, Bras and Mooca to promote celebrations and festivals. In the early twentieth century, the Italian and the dialects were spoken almost as much as the Portuguese in the city, which influenced the formation of the São Paulo dialect of today.

However this "macarronico" it is not to be confused with the more strongly conserved Talian dialect, based primarily with Venetian lexicon and grammar, and contribution of other northern Italian languages, and spoken by more isolated communities primarily in southern Brazil and Espírito Santo, while  is a more characteristically urban code-switching that often fades away with time according to the speaker.

In spite of its near-extinction, it significantly influenced the Portuguese spoken by people in the state of São Paulo, most importantly when it comes to the  dialect.

Examples

Italian and several dialects of the Italian Peninsula influenced the Portuguese of Brazil in the areas with the highest concentration of immigrants, as in the case of Sao Paulo. There the coexistence between Portuguese and Italian has created a much more open and less nasalized speech than the Portuguese of Rio de Janeiro. The diversity of the language of Italian immigrants resulted in a way of speaking that differs substantially from speaking the  "Caipira" (a dialect of the Portuguese language spoken within the State of Sao Paulo), prevalent in the area before the arrival of the Italians. The new speech was forged by the mix of Calabrian, Neapolitan, Venetian, Portuguese and even Caipira.

In the songs by the Italian-Brazilian João Rubinato (better known by his stage name, Adoniran Barbosa), the son of immigrants from Cavarzere (Venezia), the "Italian Samba" song is a good representative of foreign speaking in Brazil. With a typically Brazilian rhythm, the author mixes Portuguese and Italian, demonstrating what was happening and still occurs in some neighborhoods of Sao Paulo with the "macarronico":

See also
 Adoniran Barbosa, composer in 
 Carcamano, the dated pejorative term for Italians in Brazil
 Cocoliche, the analogous Spanish-Italian interlanguage in the River Plate area

References

Bibliography
 Carnevale, Edoardo. La condizione dell’emigrante italiano nella città di São Paulo: testi e contesti di rappresentazione dello spazio raccontato Universita' di Milano. Milano, 2014. 

Italian language in the Americas
Portuguese language in the Americas
Languages of Brazil
Extinct languages of South America
Macaronic language